This article is one of a series providing information about endemism among birds in the world's various zoogeographic zones. For an overview of this subject see Endemism in birds.

Patterns of endemism
This region is notable not just for the high number of endemic species, but for endemism in higher-level taxonomic groupings too.
This article is one of a series providing information about endemism among birds in the world's various zoogeographic zones. For an overview of this subject see Endemism in birds.

Family-level endemism

The following families are endemic to the region:

 Palmchat, a passerine family (Dulidae), containing a single species found only on Hispaniola.
 the todies, a family (Todidae) with five species, found only on the Greater Antilles.
 the Cuban warblers, a passerine family (Teretistridae), containing two species on Cuba
 the Hispaniolan tanagers, Phaenicophilidae, a passerine family, containing 4 species in 3 genera on Hispaniola
 the Puerto Rican tanager, a passerine family (Nesospingidae), containing a single species found only on Puerto Rico
 the chat-tanagers (Calyptophilidae) a passerine family, containing 2 species found only on Hispaniola
 the spindalises, a passerine family (Spindalidae), with 4 species found only on the Greater Antilles and nearby islands

Genus-level endemism

In addition to genera in the families above, the following genera are endemic to the region:

 Riccordia, with six species, the blue-headed hummingbird, Puerto Rican emerald, Cuban emerald, Hispaniolan emerald, and the extinct Brace's emerald & Gould's emerald
Margarops, with one species, the pearly-eyed thrasher
 Priotelus, with two species, the Cuban trogon and Hispaniolan trogon
 Melopyrrha, with four species, the Puerto Rican bullfinch, Cuban bullfinch, Greater Antillean bullfinch, and the extinct St. Kitts bullfinch

Six genera found only on Hispaniola:
 Nesoctites, with one species, the Antillean piculet (also monotypic within the subfamily)
 Dulus, with only one species, the palmchat (also monotypic within the family)
 Phaenicophilus, with two species, the black-crowned tanager and grey-crowned tanager
 Xenoligea, with one species, the white-winged warbler
 Microligea, with one species, the green-tailed warbler 
 Calyptophilus, with two species, the western chat-tanager and eastern chat-tanager

Five genera found only on Jamaica:
 Trochilus, with two species, red-billed and black-billed streamertails
 Loxipasser, with one species, the yellow-shouldered grassquit
 Euneornis, with one species, the orangequit
 Nesopsar, with one species, the Jamaican blackbird

Six genera found only on Cuba:
 Ferminia, a genus with only one species, the Zapata wren
 Cyanolimnas, with one species, the Zapata rail
 Margarobyas, with one species, the bare-legged owl
 Starnoenas, with one species, the blue-headed quail-dove (depending on classification, the genus may also be monotypic to the subfamily level)
 Torreornis, with one species, the Zapata sparrow
 Xiphidiopicus, with one species, the Cuban green woodpecker

One genus found only on Puerto Rico:
 Gymnasio, with one species, the Puerto Rican owl (formerly also found in the Virgin Islands, but now likely extirpated there)
One genus found only on the Bahamas:

 Nesophlox, with two species, the Bahama woodstar and Inagua woodstar

The following genera are confined to the Lesser Antilles:
 Ramphocinclus, with a single species, the white-breasted thrasher
 Cinclocerthia, with two species, the gray trembler and the brown trembler
 Allenia, with one species, the scaly-breasted thrasher
Loxigilla, with two species, the Lesser Antillean bullfinch and the Barbados bullfinch

In addition in the following genera, a high proportions of the member species are endemic to the west Indies:

Endemic Bird Areas
Birdlife International has defined a number of Endemic Bird Areas in the West Indies.

They have also defined the following secondary areas:

List of species

Species endemic to Cuba

<div style="float:top; vertical-align:left; position:relative;">

Species endemic to Hispaniola

Species endemic to Jamaica

Species endemic to Puerto Rico

Other insular endemics of the West Indies

Other species endemic to the Greater Antilles

Other species endemic to the Lesser Antilles

Other species endemic to the West Indies

Extinct birds

Near-endemics

 Zenaida dove
 Antillean nighthawk
 White-crowned pigeon
 Pearly-eyed thrasher
 Caribbean dove

The following is a list of species endemic to the region as breeding species:

The following is a list of species endemic to the region as non-breeding species:

 Kirtland's warbler

The following restricted-range species are also found in the region:

The following seabirds are restricted to the region as breeders:

 Black-capped petrel

References

External links
The Endemic Birds of Hispaniola

West Indies